Willmar may refer to:

Places
Willmar, Minnesota, United States
Willmar Air Force Station
Willmar Municipal Airport
Willmar Township, Kandiyohi County, Minnesota
Willmars, a municipality in Bavaria, Germany

People
Jean-Jacques Willmar (1792–1866), Prime Minister of Luxembourg

Companies
Willmar Windows, a Canadian division of Jeld-Wen Windows & Doors
Willmar and Sioux Falls Railway

Sports
Willmar Stingers, a summer collegiate baseball team based in Willmar, Minnesota

Other
Willmar 8, the name given to a group of women from Willmar, Minnesota who went on strike in 1977 to protest sexual discrimination by their employer.  A documentary of the same name was released in 1981.

See also
 Wilmar (disambiguation)